Selke may refer to:

People
 Davie Selke (born 1995), German footballer
 Frank J. Selke (1893–1985), Canadian ice-hockey manager and trainer
 Margrit Selke (1900–2004), agriculturist
 Ruth Eissler-Selke, née Selke (1906–1991), psychologist, author
 Sebastian Selke (born 1974), German footballer
  (b 1967 as Stefan Guschker), professor of sociology in the Faculty for Digital Media at the Furtwangen University im Schwarzwald
 Walter Selke (born 1947), German professor of theoretical physics at the RWTH Aachen
  (1901–1971), German agricultural chemist

Awards
 Frank J. Selke Trophy (National Hockey League), awarded annually to the National Hockey League forward who demonstrates the most skill in the defensive component of the game
 Frank J. Selke Memorial Trophy (Quebec Major Junior Hockey League), awarded annually to the most sportsmanlike player in the Quebec Major Junior Hockey League

Places
 Selke (river), a river in the Harz Mountains of Germany
 Ballenstedt/Bode-Selke-Aue, a collective municipality in Saxony-Anhalt, Germany

Other uses
 Selke Valley Railway, a German steam railway in the Harz Mountains that runs along the Selke valley

See Also
 Selkie